Andorra competed at the 2018 Mediterranean Games in Tarragona, Spain from the 22 June to 1 July 2018.

Andorra was represented by 32 athletes in 13 sports.

Athletics 

Men
Track events

Basketball 3X3

Men's tournament

Women's tournament

Boules 

Pétanque

Cycling 

Men

Golf

Gymnastics 
  Rhythmic gymnastics

Judo

Karate 

Women

Sailing 

Men

Shooting 

Women

Swimming 

Men

Women

Taekwondo 

Men

Tennis 

Men

References

Nations at the 2018 Mediterranean Games
2018
Mediterranean Games